Scutellaria alpina, the alpine skullcap, is a species of flowering plant in the mint family, Lamiaceae.

Description
It is a small rhizomatous perennial plant. The stems are square, prostrate-ascending, branched, woody at the base and hairy. Leaves are arranged in opposite pairs, pubescent, oval, rounded at the base, 2–3 cm long, with a short petiole and crenulate margins. Inflorescence is a terminal tetragonal spike. The flowers are blue-violet or purple-white, 2.5–3 cm long. They bloom from June to August.

Distribution
This species is native to central and southern Europe and Russia.

Habitat

References
Biolib
Encyclopaedia of Life

External links
Luirig.altervista
Tela Botanica

alpina
Flora of Europe
Plants described in 1753
Taxa named by Carl Linnaeus